CUMYL-CH-MEGACLONE (CUMYL-CHMGACLONE, SGT-270) is a gamma-carboline based synthetic cannabinoid receptor agonist that has been sold as a designer drug, first being identified in Hungary in December 2018.

See also 
 5F-CUMYL-PEGACLONE
 CUMYL-5F-P7AICA
 CUMYL-CB-MEGACLONE
 CUMYL-BC-HPMEGACLONE-221
 CUMYL-CBMINACA
 CUMYL-THPINACA

References 

Cannabinoids
Designer drugs
Gamma-Carbolines